The 1967 Oregon Webfoots football team represented the University of Oregon during the 1967 NCAA University Division football season. All five home games were played on campus in Eugene at the new Autzen Stadium, opened this season with a natural grass field (and replaced with AstroTurf two years later).

The Ducks met USC for the first time since 1958, the final Pacific Coast Conference (PCC) season. (UCLA was similarly off of UO's schedule until 1969).

Oregon's two victories came against the Palouse neighbors, Idaho and
Washington State. After opening with five losses, shutouts in the last three, the  win over the Vandals on October 21 was the first for Frei and the first for Oregon in Autzen Stadium. The Ducks traveled to Pullman two weeks later and defeated the Cougars  for their sole conference win. In between, they lost  to top-ranked USC in Los Angeles, but held junior running back O. J. Simpson to just 63 yards on 23 carries. He was similarly contained the following season in Eugene.

In the season-ending Civil War game at Autzen, the visiting #8 Oregon State "Giant Killers" were held scoreless for three quarters, but reached the end zone twice in the fourth period to win 14–10, their fourth straight in the rivalry.

Oregon's statistical leaders in 1967 were Eric Olson with 840 passing yards, Claxton Welch with 474 rushing yards, and Roger Smith with 402 receiving yards.

Schedule

References

External links
 WSU Libraries: Game video – Oregon at Washington State – November 4, 1967

Oregon
Oregon Ducks football seasons
Oregon Webfoots football